Kim Cheong-Sim (born February 8, 1976) is a South Korean handball player who competed in the 1996 Summer Olympics and the 2012 Summer Olympics.

In 1996 she was part of the South Korean team which who the silver medal. She played one match.

External links

References

1976 births
Living people
South Korean female handball players
Olympic handball players of South Korea
Handball players at the 1996 Summer Olympics
Handball players at the 2012 Summer Olympics
Olympic silver medalists for South Korea
Olympic medalists in handball
Asian Games medalists in handball
Handball players at the 2002 Asian Games
Medalists at the 1996 Summer Olympics
Asian Games gold medalists for South Korea
Medalists at the 2002 Asian Games
21st-century South Korean women